The Journal of Materials Research is a peer-reviewed scientific journal which covers research in materials science. The journal was established in 1986 and is the official journal of the Materials Research Society. The journal is published by Springer Science+Business Media and the editor-in-chief is Ramamoorthy Ramesh (University of California, Berkeley).

Abstracting and indexing
The journal is abstracted and indexed in:
EBSCO databases
Ei Compendex

Science Citation Index Expanded

Scopus
According to the Journal Citation Reports, the journal has a 2021 impact factor of 2.909.

References

External links

 

English-language journals
Publications established in 1986
Springer Science+Business Media academic journals
Semi-monthly journals